Marcel Schneider may refer to:

Marcel Schneider (golfer) (born 1990), German golfer
Marcel Schneider (writer) (1913–2009), French writer